Monitor or monitor may refer to:

Places
 Monitor, Alberta
 Monitor, Indiana, town in the United States
 Monitor, Kentucky
 Monitor, Oregon, unincorporated community in the United States
 Monitor, Washington
 Monitor, Logan County, West Virginia
 Monitor, Monroe County, West Virginia
 Loope, California, formerly Monitor

Arts, entertainment, and media

Fictional characters
 Monitor (Mar Novu), a DC comics character
 Monitors (DC Comics), a group of fictional comic book characters, who appear in books published by DC Comics

Periodicals
 Monitor (magazine), a weekly newsmagazine published in Podgorica, Montenegro
 Monitor (Polish newspaper), an 18th-century Polish newspaper
 Concord Monitor, a daily newspaper in New Hampshire, United States
 The Monitor (Sydney), a biweekly newspaper published between 1826 and 1841
 Daily Monitor, a Ugandan newspaper

Television
 Monitor (UK TV programme), a BBC arts programme which aired from 1958 to 1965
 Monitor (U.S. TV program), a 1983–1984 American newsmagazine television program that aired on NBC

Other uses in arts, entertainment, and media
 Monitor (radio program), an American radio program which aired on NBC radio from 1955 to 1975
 Monitor (band), an American punk rock band
 Monitor, a 1975 work by English video artist Stephen Partridge
 Monitor, a Czech record label sold to EMI Czech Republic in 1994
 The Christian Science Monitor, an international news organization founded in 1908, that publishes self-titled periodicals

Brands and enterprises
 Monitor, a trade name for Methamidophos, a phosphorus based pesticide
 Monitor Deloitte, a management consulting firm

Computing and technology
 Monitor (synchronization), an approach to synchronize two or more computer tasks that use a shared resource
 Computer monitor, an output device that displays information in pictorial form
 In-ear monitors, earpieces for performers on stage or in a studio
 Machine code monitor, program allowing users to view or change memory locations on a computer
 Resident monitor, an early primitive operating system
 Stage monitors or foldback (sound engineering), loudspeakers for performers on stage
 Studio monitor, professional grade loudspeaker designed specifically for audio production and engineering
 System monitor, a hardware or software component used to monitor system resources and performance in a computer system
 Virtual machine monitor, or hypervisor, is a software that creates and runs virtual machines, allowing multiple operating system images to run simultaneously on a single piece of hardware
 Firefox Monitor, email monitoring application (see Firefox version history)

Healthcare
 Monitor (NHS), a former regulator for health services in England
 Monitor, a person who performs self-monitoring
 Clinical monitor or clinical research associate, a health-care professional who works in monitoring of clinical trials

Ships
 Monitor (warship), a heavily armed warship design preceding the battleship, named for the USS Monitor
 Breastwork monitor, a type of turret ship with a raised superstructure and higher freeboard than the first monitors
 List of breastwork monitors of the Royal Navy
 List of Russian and Soviet monitors
 River monitor, a type of warship designed for fighting on inland waterways
 , a shallow-draught turret ship of the United States Navy

Water jets
 Monitor, a pressurised water jet used in hydraulic mining
 Fire monitor, a water jet used for firefighting

Other meanings
 Monitor (architecture), a subsidiary roof structure
 Hall monitor, a student who supervises the corridors of a school
 Monitor lizard, any lizard of the family Varanidae (once believed to warn of crocodile attacks)

See also
 
 
 Monitoring (disambiguation)
 The Monitor (disambiguation)
 The Monitors (disambiguation)
 Moniteur (disambiguation)